"Everybody" is a song by French DJ and record producer Martin Solveig, released as the lead single from his second studio album, Hedonist (2005). The song was released in the United Kingdom in July 2005, Australia in August 2005, and France in September 2005. Written and produced by Solveig, the song peaked at number 37 on the French Singles Chart and number 22 on the UK Singles Chart.

Track listings

Charts

Release history

References

2005 songs
Martin Solveig songs
Songs written by Martin Solveig
Universal Music Group singles